An Il-76MD aircraft operated by the Russian Air Force early in the morning on June 24, 2022 near the Dyagilevo air base in the Mikhailovsky highway area in the city of Ryazan.

Crew 
There were 9 crew members on board. 

The following people died as a result of the disaster:

 Vladimir Petrushin (aircraft commander);
 Stepan Perminov (navigator)
 Nikolai Gorbunov (flight engineer-instructor);
 Dmitriy Andreev (aeronautical engineering by ADO);
 Lobanov Alexey (cadet, 5th year in flight school; died in the hospital).

Chronology of events 
The aircraft performed a training flight from Orenburg to Belgorod with an intermediate landing (for refueling) in Ryazan. There was no cargo on board of the aircraft.

Immediately after takeoff from the air base in Ryazan, a fire broke out in one of the engines. The crew decided to make an emergency landing. Before landing, the plane circled over the meadows.

At 3:18 PM, the plane made a hard landing on the ground, damaging power lines. The plane crashed and caught fire. There is no significant damage on the ground after the crash.

Three people died immediately after the crash. The remaining 6 were hospitalized. Two more people later died in the hospital.

References 

Accidents and incidents involving the Ilyushin Il-76
Aviation accidents and incidents in Russia in 2022
Aviation accidents and incidents in 2022
June 2022 events in Russia
Aviation accidents and incidents in Russia
Ryazan Oblast